Megan Lee is a chess Woman International Master. She won the Washington State Championship in 2020 and 2022, and the 2019 U.S. Women's Open. Previously, Lee won the 2013 North American Youth U18 Girls Championship and the 2009 Kasparov All-Girls Nationals Championship. In 2022, she tied for 5th place at the US Women's Chess Championship with a score of 7/13 points.  She tied for 10th place at the 2021 US Women's Chess Championship with a score of 4/11 points.

She graduated from Newport High School (Bellevue, Washington), having led its chess team to win the 2014 Washington High School State Team Championship. Lee completed her BFA in Industrial Design at the Rhode Island School of Design with a minor in Art History. Outside of chess, she runs two small businesses, an embroidery shop and a lifestyle brand, Snippet Studios.

References

External links
 
 
 

1996 births
Living people
American female chess players
Chess Woman International Masters
21st-century American women